Wim Van Belleghem (born 10 June 1963) is a Belgian former rower from Koolkerke near Bruges. He won the World Championships lightweight class  single scull in 1987. After Polydore Veirman of the Royal Club Nautique de Gand, and Eveline Peleman of Royal Sport Nautique de Gand he is the most important Belgian single sculler of all time.

Van Belleghem was born in Bruges. He was world champion in the lightweight single sculls at the 1987 World Rowing Championships in Copenhagen. At the Olympic Games in Seoul (1988), he partnered Alain Lewuillon from Brussels, the Belgian national assistant-coach, in the coxless pairs. They came fourth in the final just one tenth of a second short of the bronze and Lewuillon had some shoe problems during that race. Van Belleghem also won silver medals in the single sculls in the 1989 and 1990 World Rowing Championships, and a bronze medal in 1991. In 1991, he won the Diamond Challenge Sculls at Henley Royal Regatta in single scull open category racing for Royal Club Nautique de Gand.  Van Belleghem was coached by Jens Mac Marren (S), Yvan Vanier (NL), Mike Spracklen, and Riszard Kedjiersky (P) among other.

Formerly a dealer for Aylings Rowing Boat in Belgium, he now runs a transport company and a car showroom in Bruges.

References

External links
 

1963 births
Living people
Belgian male rowers
Olympic rowers of Belgium
Rowers at the 1988 Summer Olympics
Rowers at the 1992 Summer Olympics
Flemish sportspeople
Sportspeople from Bruges
World Rowing Championships medalists for Belgium
20th-century Belgian people